The Order of the Cloud and Banner also known as the Order of the Resplendent Banner is a military award of the Republic of China. It was instituted on June 15, 1935 and is awarded in nine grades for contributions to national security. The insignia of the order features a fluttering yellow flag, surrounded by white clouds on a blue field. This image is surrounded by golden rays.

Grades
The order is divided into nine grades, they are as follows:

Recipients

International
 Edward McGill Alexander
 John R. Allen 
 Henry H. Arnold
 Claude Auchinleck
 Robert O. Bare
 Gilbert Bartholomew RAF British Air Attaché to China 1943-46
 John Birch (missionary)
 Alan Bruce Blaxland
 Charles Bond (pilot)
 Leslie Bonnet
 Wilburt S. Brown
 Joseph J. Cappucci
 Bernard Chacksfield
 Prince Charles, Count of Flanders
 Levi R. Chase 
 Claire Lee Chennault
 Philip Christison
 Vasily Chuikov
 Gareth Clayton (RAF officer)
 William T. Clement
 Henry Crowe (RAF officer)
 Andrew Cunningham, 1st Viscount Cunningham of Hyndhope
 Sydney de Kantzow
 Jimmy Doolittle
 Gabriel P. Disosway
 Denis Earp
 Dr.C. Dexter Ebertz DVM
 Dwight D. Eisenhower
 Peter Fleming
 William Foster MacNeece Foster
 Julian N. Frisbie
 Guy Garrod
 Wallace M. Greene
 Vernon M. Guymon
 Hunter Harris Jr.
 Tex Hill
 John A. Hilger
 Bruce K. Holloway
 Frederick J. Horne
 Samuel L. Howard
 Byron F. Johnson
 Lt. General Sir Gordon Jolly
 Louis R. Jones
 C. Turner Joy
 Robert Halperin
 Robert P. Keller
 Timofey Khryukin
 Nikolay Krylov
 Kim Hong-il
 Willard A. Kitts
 John P. Lucas
 Robert B. Luckey
 Alvin Luedecke
 Rodion Malinovsky
 Dr. Harold Marcus
 Arthur T. Mason
 James M. Masters, Sr.
 John H. Masters
 Verne J. McCaul
 Lt. Col. Alfred Medendorp
 Georg Meiring
 Kirill Meretskov
 Thomas Hinman Moorer
 Louis Mountbatten, 1st Earl Mountbatten of Burma
 DeWitt Peck
 Richard Peirse
 Roy Benjamin Pitts
 Earl S. Piper
 Chesty Puller
 Mohan Shamsher Jang Bahadur Rana
 Edward F. Rector
 Keller E. Rockey
 Richard P. Ross Jr.
 John Dale Ryan
 Alfredo M. Santos
 Thomas G. W. Settle
 Samuel R. Shaw
 Lemuel C. Shepherd Jr.
 Austin Shofner
 Robert T. Smith
 Marcos Soliman
 George E. Stratemeyer
 Stepan Suprun
 Rafael Cavanillas Prosper
 Glen Syndercombe
 Carlos Talbott
 Neil D. Van Sickle
 Constand Viljoen
 John W. Vogt Jr.
 William Childs Westmoreland
 Lewis William Walt
 Archibald Wavell, 1st Earl Wavell
 William J. Whaling
 Isaac D. White
 Frederick L. Wieseman
 Louis E. Woods
 William A. Worton
 Harry E. Yarnell
 John C. Young
 Lt. Col Alan "Jake" Engle (USAF)

Chinese generals
 Chang Guan-chung
 Chen Changjie (general)
 Hu Zongnan
 Huang Wei
 Li Mi (Republic of China general)
 Qiu Qingquan
 Shen Yi-ming
 Yen Teh-fa
 Zheng Dongguo

See also 
List of orders, decorations and medals of the Republic of China

References

External links 

Orders, decorations, and medals of the Republic of China
Awards established in 1935
1935 establishments in China